Chlorthiophos is an organophosphorus pesticide. It is a mixture of isomers:

O,O-diethyl-O-(2,5-dichloro-4-methylthio)phenyl phosphorothioate (ca. 73%)

O,O-diethyl-O-(4,5-dichloro-2-methylthio)phenyl phosphorothioate (ca. 13%)

O,O-diethyl-O-(2,4-dichloro-5-methylthio)phenyl phosphorothioate (ca. 14%)

It is extremely poisonous and is classified as an extremely hazardous substance in the United States as defined in Section 302 of the U.S. Emergency Planning and Community Right-to-Know Act (42 U.S.C. 11002), and is subject to strict reporting requirements by facilities which produce, store, or use it in significant quantities.

References

Pesticides
Organothiophosphate esters